The 21st Online Film Critics Society Awards, honoring the best in film for 2017, were announced on December 17, 2017.

Nominees

References 

2017 film awards
2017